The men's two handed shot put was a track and field athletics event held as part of the Athletics at the 1912 Summer Olympics programme.  It was the only appearance of the event at the Olympics, along with the other two handed throws.  The format of the event was such that each thrower threw the shot three times with his right hand and three times with his left hand.  The best distance with each hand was summed to give a total.  The three finalists received three more throws with each hand. The competition was held on Thursday, July 11, 1912. Seven shot putters from five nations competed. NOCs could enter up to 12 athletes.

Results

The top four throwers were the same as those in the standard shot put event, though in a different order. McDonald, who had won the one-handed event, was not able to match Rose in their best-hand throws a day later.  Niklander's excellent off-hand throw in the first round gave him the lead going into the finals.

Rose and McDonald bettered Niklander's off-hand throw in the final, but barely.  A nearly even result with the off-hand (Rose won by .02 metres) gave the win to Rose.  Niklander, only .02 metres behind McDonald and .04 behind Rose with the off-hand, placed third when his best-hand throw measured more than a metre further than he'd thrown in the standard event.

References

External links
 
 

Shot put
1912